Power Plant and Dam No. 4 is a historic hydroelectric power generation station on the Potomac River, located near Shepherdstown on the county line between Berkeley and Jefferson County, West Virginia.  The power plant is a tall one-story, limestone building on a high stone foundation.  It is five bays long and has a gable roof.  Dam 4 uses horizontal shaft turbines connected by rope drives to horizontal shaft generators. This plant is probably the last commercially operated rope-driven hydroelectric plant in the United States. The building is built into a hillside, so the main floor is the top floor.  The power plant was originally built by the Martinsburg Electric Company.

It was listed on the National Register of Historic Places in 1980.

In 2013, the power plant was sold by FirstEnergy to Harbor Hydro Holdings LLC. The power plant has a rated capacity of 1.9 megawatts.

Building the Dam

The dam was originally built for the Chesapeake and Ohio Canal. On June 7, 1832, the contract was awarded to Joseph Hollman, and the work was completed in June 1835, at a cost of $50.803.15 To avoid construction costs, the canal entered the slackwater above the dam, and continued in the slackwater for about 3 miles. This area was dubbed "Big Slackwater" by the canallers.

See also 

 Power Plant and Dam No. 5

References

External links

Buildings and structures in Berkeley County, West Virginia
Buildings and structures in Jefferson County, West Virginia
Dams on the National Register of Historic Places in West Virginia
Historic American Engineering Record in West Virginia
Hydroelectric power plants in West Virginia
Industrial buildings and structures on the National Register of Historic Places in West Virginia
National Register of Historic Places in Berkeley County, West Virginia
Potomac River
Dams completed in 1910
Dams in West Virginia
Energy infrastructure completed in 1910
Chesapeake and Ohio Canal
Energy infrastructure on the National Register of Historic Places
1910 establishments in West Virginia